Uranthoecium is a genus of plants in the grass family. The only known species is Uranthoecium truncatum, native to Queensland, New South Wales, South Australia, Northern Territory, and Western Australia. A common name is flat-stem grass.

References

Panicoideae
Endemic flora of Australia
Monotypic Poaceae genera